Ruth Negga (born 4 May 1981
) is an Irish actress known for the AMC television series Preacher and the film Loving. For her portrayal of Mildred Loving in the latter, Negga received several major nominations from the Academy Awards, British Academy Film Awards and the Golden Globe Awards, and won the Irish Film and Television Award for Best Actress. In 2022, Negga made her Broadway debut in a production of Shakespeare's Macbeth as Lady Macbeth, and earned a nomination for the Tony Award for Best Performance by a Leading Actress in a Play.

Negga has also appeared in the films Capital Letters (2004) (also released as Trafficked in some countries), Isolation (2005), Breakfast on Pluto (2005), Warcraft (2016), and Passing (2021). Other television projects include the BBC mini-series Criminal Justice, RTÉ's Love/Hate, E4's Misfits, and ABC's Marvel's Agents of S.H.I.E.L.D.

Early life and education
Negga was born in 1981 in Addis Ababa, Ethiopia, to an Irish mother, Nora, and an Ethiopian father. Her parents met while working at a hospital in Ethiopia; her mother was a nurse and her father was a doctor. Negga, an only child, lived in the country until she was four. Her father died in a car accident when she was seven. She grew up in Limerick, Ireland, until moving to London, England for secondary school.

Negga studied at the Samuel Beckett Centre at Trinity College Dublin, graduating with a BA in Acting Studies.

Career

Negga made her screen debut in the Irish film Capital Letters (2004), playing the lead role of Taiwo. She went on to play the lead role of Mary in Isolation the following year. Prior to this, she had been working mostly in theatre. After seeing Negga act, director Neil Jordan changed the script to Breakfast on Pluto so that she could appear in the movie. She has also starred in Colour Me Kubrick (2005), with John Malkovich, and the short films The Four Horsemen, 3-Minute 4-Play and Stars.

On television Negga has appeared in Doctors, Criminal Justice and the Irish series Love Is the Drug. She played the lead role of Doris "Sid" Siddiqi in the BBC Three series Personal Affairs, alongside Laura Aikman, Annabel Scholey and Maimie McCoy. Negga portrayed Rosie in the first two series of RTÉ's Love/Hate.

Negga appeared as Dame Shirley Bassey in the BBC production Shirley in 2011 and won the IFTA Award for Best Actress (Television) for her performance. Her theatre work includes roles in Duck, Titus Andronicus and Lay Me Down Softly. As of 2007, she began working with the Irish theatrical group Pan Pan Theatre. In 2010, she played Ophelia in the National Theatre's production of Hamlet. She also provided voice acting in the video game Dark Souls II, playing Shanalotte, otherwise known as "the Emerald Herald".

In 2013, it was announced that Negga had been booked for a recurring role as Raina on the American TV series Agents of S.H.I.E.L.D. She appeared in 17 episodes of the programme. She filmed scenes for Steve McQueen's Oscar-winning 12 Years a Slave, but her role was ultimately cut from the movie. In March 2015, Negga was cast in the role of Tulip O'Hare in AMC fantasy drama series Preacher, which debuted the following year.

In 2016, Negga portrayed Mildred Loving in the Jeff Nichols historical romance Loving, which premiered at the 2016 Cannes Film Festival and later screened at the Toronto International Film Festival. The film is based on the true story of the Lovings, a married interracial couple in the 1950s and 1960s Virginia, whose relationship led to the Supreme Court decision Loving v. Virginia. Negga received rave reviews for the role, and garnered multiple award nominations, including for the Academy Award for Best Actress, the Golden Globe Award for Best Actress in a Motion Picture – Drama, and the BAFTA Rising Star Award.

Negga played Prince Hamlet in the Gate Theatre's 2018 production (directed by Yaël Farber) of Hamlet (Having a woman play the role of Prince Hamlet although depicted as a man in the play is a precedent established in Dublin by Fanny Furnival in 1741). Negga reprised the role of Hamlet to equal acclaim at St. Ann's Warehouse in Spring 2020. In February 2021, it was announced that Negga will star in and executive produce a limited drama series about legendary Jazz age performer and civil rights activist Josephine Baker.

In 2021, Negga starred in Rebecca Hall's period drama Passing opposite Tessa Thompson. The film is adapted from Nella Larsen's 1929 novel of the same name. The film premiered at the 2021 Sundance Film Festival and was shown at the New York Film Festival in the fall. Negga portrays Clare, a light-skinned Black woman in 1920s New York, navigating the color line by passing as a white woman. Variety praised Negga's performance writing, "Negga, brittle and dazzling, commands attention exactly the way Clare does in every room she walks into." For her performance, Negga was nominated for the Golden Globe Award, BAFTA and Screen Actors Guild Award in the category of Best Supporting Actress.

In September 2021, it was announced that Negga will be making her Broadway debut in a production of Shakespeare's Macbeth as Lady Macbeth, alongside Daniel Craig as the titular character. For her performance in the play, she received a nomination for the Tony Award for Best Performance by a Leading Actress in a Play.

In October 2022, Negga was cast to star in Dan Levy's directorial debut Good Grief.

In the media
In 2020, Negga was ranked number 10 on The Irish Times list of Ireland's greatest film actors. In 2006 she was also chosen as the Irish Shooting Star for the Berlin Film Festival.

Personal life
In 2006, Negga was engaged to actor Tadhg Murphy, whom she had been dating since university.

Negga was in a relationship with actor Dominic Cooper beginning in 2010. They first met in 2009 while working together in a stage adaptation of Phèdre with Helen Mirren. The two lived together in London's Primrose Hill. The couple were in a relationship for six years; however, Negga has pointed out that it took the press years to learn of the break-up, which was first reported in April 2018. Negga appeared opposite Cooper in AMC's Preacher, in which the pair portrayed lovers, and has said that they are "best friends".

As of 2020, Negga resides in Los Angeles, California.

Theatre
 Duck (as Cat): Traverse Theatre, Edinburgh (2003)
 The Burial at Thebes (as Antigone): Abbey Theatre, Dublin (2004)
 The Bacchae of Baghdad (as Chorus): Abbey Theatre, Dublin (2006)
 The Crucible (as Abigail Williams): Abbey Theatre, Dublin (2007)
 Phèdre (as Aricia): National Theatre London (2009)
 Hamlet (as Ophelia): National Theatre London (2010/11)
 Playboy of the Western World (as Pegeen Mike): Old Vic Theatre London (2011)
 Hamlet (as Hamlet): Gate Theatre, Dublin (2018)
 Macbeth (as Lady Macbeth): Longacre Theatre, NYC (2022)

Filmography

Film

Television

Video games

Awards and nominations
 
Negga was nominated as 2003's Most Promising Newcomer at the Olivier Awards. She was chosen as Ireland's Shooting Star for the 2006 Berlin Film Festival. She has received many accolades for her role of Mildred Loving in the 2016 film Loving, including Academy Award, Critic's Choice, and Golden Globe Award nominations for Best Actress. In 2022, her portrayal of Clare Bellew in 2021 film Passing garnered her critical recognition including the National Society of Film Critics Award for Best Supporting Actress, and industry nominations from the Golden Globes, Screen Actors Guild, and the BAFTA.

See also

 List of actors with Academy Award nominations

References

External links

 
 Pan Pan Theatre official website

Living people
1982 births
20th-century Ethiopian women
21st-century Ethiopian actresses
21st-century Irish actresses
Alumni of Trinity College Dublin
Actresses from Limerick (city)
Ethiopian film actresses
Ethiopian people of Irish descent
Ian Charleson Award winners
Irish expatriates in England
Irish film actresses
Irish people of Ethiopian descent
Irish stage actresses
Irish television actresses
Black Irish people